The Everyman Hampstead is the original site of the Everyman Cinemas group, a boutique independent cinema chain, located in Holly Bush Vale, Hampstead, in North West London. 

It shows new releases, as well as classic films and special events, such as the New York Metropolitan Opera, National Theatre Live, film festivals, live Q&As, and seasons. 

The venue features two screens (a 122-seat room with club suites, gallery seating and a vaulted ceiling; and a more intimate 72-seat screen), as well as a private hire room, a licensed bar and restaurant, Sony Digital 4K projectors, and Dolby Digital surround sound.

History 
The building was first opened as the Hampstead Drill Hall and Assembly Rooms in the 1880s. Later it was transformed into a theatre, the Everyman Theatre, which opened in 1920 under the direction of Norman MacDermott (1890–1977), with the first British production of Jacinto Benavente's The Bonds of Interest (Los intereses creados, 1907). You Never Can Tell, opened two weeks later and was a success, leading to the performance of more revivals from George Bernard Shaw. Another notable performance is that of Noël Coward's The Vortex, which was first performed there.

The Everyman opened as a cinema on Boxing Day 1933. The opening programme consisted of Rene Clair's Le Million, Turbulent Timber, a Mack Sennett comedy, a Disney cartoon and Paramount News. The Everyman had been bought by a local solicitor, James Fairfax-Jones. "FJ", as he was known, lived with wife, Tessa, in a sprawling manor house in the secluded Vale of Health.  He ran the Everyman as a hobby rather than as a business, hoping that its 302 seats would generate enough money to pay the staff and the overheads as well as his annual treat – attending the Venice Film Festival, which he surveyed from the splendour of the Cipriani Hotel. His staff, principally projectionist Tom Robinson and manager Dennis Lloyd, stayed with him for decades. Usherettes were all part-time and were an extraordinary mix – some were wartime refugees, others local au pairs, language students and so on. One woman who worked in the cash desk selling tickets owned the West End furniture store Heals.

Fairfax-Jones died in April 1973. His son, Martin, took over as Managing Director of the cinema, which was programmed until 1977 by one of its managers, Adrian Turner, and subsequently by Tony Dalton and Peter Howden.  Since 1933 the Everyman always showed a wide range of movies in repertory seasons - the Marx Brothers, the Maxim Gorky Trilogy, Jean-Luc Godard, Humphrey Bogart and Ingmar Bergman being especially popular with the local Hampstead crowd.  Local residents such as John Gielgud, Peter O'Toole and Melvyn Bragg were regulars.  HRH Princess Margaret brought her two children to see High Society.

In the 1980s, the Everyman had various owners, with one turning the basement into the second auditorium.

When the cinema was threatened with closure in 2000, it was bought by entrepreneur Daniel Broch as the flagship for the new Everyman Cinemas group, a company that has seen subsequent rapid expansion.

Cultural references 
The cinema is referred to in the song, "Hampstead Incident" by Donovan, with the line: "Standing by the Everyman, digging the rigging of my sails."

The 1960 Michael Powell psychological-horror classic Peeping Tom, credited as a founder of the slasher genre, mentions the cinema twice by name. Two original posters for the film still hang in the lobby.

References

Further reading
 Everymania: The History of the Everyman Theatre Hampstead, 1920–26 Norman MacDermott (Society for Theatre Research, April 1975)

External links
 The Everyman Hampstead Official Website
 Everyman Theatre records, 1920–1923, held by the Billy Rose Theatre Division, New York Public Library for the Performing Arts

Buildings and structures in Hampstead
Buildings and structures in the London Borough of Camden
Cinemas in London
Former theatres in London
Theatres completed in 1920
Tourist attractions in the London Borough of Camden